June James IV (December 2, 1962 – May 8, 1990) was an American football linebacker  who played two seasons in the National Football League (NFL) with the Detroit Lions and Indianapolis Colts. He was drafted by the Lions in the ninth round of the 1985 NFL Draft. He played college football at the University of Texas at Austin and attended Southeast High School in Kansas City, Missouri. James was also a member of the Saskatchewan Roughriders of the Canadian Football League.

References

External links
Just Sports Stats

1962 births
1990 deaths
Players of American football from Louisiana
American football linebackers
Canadian football linebackers
African-American players of American football
African-American players of Canadian football
Texas Longhorns football players
Detroit Lions players
Indianapolis Colts players
Saskatchewan Roughriders players
People from Jennings, Louisiana
20th-century African-American sportspeople